Nia Temple Sanchez Booko (born February 15, 1990) is an American model, television presenter, and beauty pageant titleholder who won Miss USA 2014.

Early life
Nia Sanchez was born in Sacramento, California on February 15, 1990, to David Sanchez, a military veteran born in a military base in Germany, and mother Nicole Sanford, who was born in a military base in Iran. Her paternal grandfather, Wilbur Sanchez, is Mexican and her paternal grandmother is German, while her mother is of Spanish, and other European mixture. Her parents divorced when she was 6 and she briefly lived in a women's shelter with her mother. When she was eight she and her brother (David, Jr.), moved to Menifee, California with their father, and she went on to graduate from Paloma Valley High School in 2008.

Pageants
Her first beauty pageant was the Miss San Jacinto Valley, which she entered when she was 13; at 19, she won Miss Citrus Valley USA, which qualified her to take part in the Miss Turismo Latino competition in Ecuador in 2009.

Miss California USA
Sanchez first competed in the Miss California USA 2010 pageant (as Miss Citrus Valley USA) and was second runner-up out of 133 contestants, losing to eventual titleholder Nicole Johnson. Sanchez has also competed in and won Miss Riverside County USA 2011 and Miss Hollywood USA 2012, both of which resulted in unsuccessful Miss California USA bids.

Miss Nevada USA
As Miss South Las Vegas USA, Sanchez was crowned as Miss Nevada USA by Chelsea Caswell on January 12, 2014, at Artemus W. Ham Concert Hall at University of Nevada, Las Vegas, winning the title on her first attempt.

Miss USA 2014
Sanchez represented Nevada at Miss USA 2014 in Baton Rouge, Louisiana and was crowned as the winner by outgoing titleholder Erin Brady of Connecticut on June 8, 2014, beating 2nd runner-up Tiana Griggs of Georgia and 1st runner-up Audra Mari of North Dakota. During the final question portion of the competition, she was asked by judge Rumer Willis about the high rate of sexual assault among undergraduate women to which she responded that it is important to be able to defend yourself. She was the first Miss Nevada USA contestant to win Miss USA and the fourth Hispanic to win Miss USA after Laura Harring in 1985, Lynnette Cole in 2000, and Susie Castillo in 2003. This was the first time since Miss USA 2007 that the contest had not been held in Nevada.

Controversy
After winning Miss USA, a carpetbagger controversy arose regarding her claimed Nevada residence. After failing to win Miss California USA in 2010, 2011 and 2012, Sanchez reportedly created a paper trail to establish her eligibility to compete in Miss Nevada USA. Supposedly Sanchez had worked at Disneyland until November 2013 and had become Miss Nevada USA in January 2014, although competition rules state that Miss Nevada USA eligibility requires six months residency in the state as evidenced by two documents from "voter ID or registration card, tax return, school records, employment documents, telephone bill, utility bill, bank statement, credit card statement or lease/deed." Sanchez is reported to have spoken with Miss Nevada USA pageant director Shanna Moakler to determine the minimum eligibility requirements. Sanchez is represented by AC Talent Agency, which has Las Vegas and Los Angeles offices, but is listed as based in Los Angeles. Sanchez has stated that she owns a home in Las Vegas and listed herself as based in Los Angeles as a marketing ploy due to the types of opportunities available in Los Angeles relative to those available in Las Vegas.

Miss Universe 2014
Sanchez represented the United States at Miss Universe 2014 which was held January 25, 2015, at the U.S. Century Bank Arena on the site of the Florida International University in Doral, Miami, Florida and finished as 1st runner-up to Paulina Vega of Colombia.

Personal life
Sanchez is a fifth-degree black belt in taekwondo, which she began practicing when she was 8 years old. She was the first Miss USA ever featured on the cover of Tae Kwon Do Times Magazine. She also studied jazz and ballet for five years. At age 17, she visited Kenya, and after her high school graduation she spent time working as a nanny in Europe. She had visited 12 countries around the world before becoming Miss Nevada USA. She spends three months of the year serving on a mission in Mexico. She acted in the roles of various Disney princess characters at Hong Kong Disneyland where she worked for seven months in 2012.

Sanchez began dating actor Daniel Booko before she won Miss Nevada USA. Booko proposed to Sanchez on a private terrace in New York City in October 2014. The couple married on October 17, 2015, in Temecula, California. They have one son, born in 2021.

References

External links

 Miss USA 2014 - Photos from 1st Press Conference
 Meet the new Miss Usa Nia Sanchez

Living people
1990 births
Miss USA 2014 delegates
Miss USA winners
Miss Universe 2014 contestants
Actresses from Sacramento, California
American actresses of Mexican descent
American people of German descent
American people of Spanish descent
American female taekwondo practitioners
American female models
People from Menifee, California
Beauty pageant controversies
People from Henderson, Nevada
People from Las Vegas
Hispanic and Latino American female models